Blood of Heroes is a superhero role-playing game published by Pulsar Games. It was a successor to DC Heroes and used that game's Mayfair Exponential Game System, or MEGS. Blood of Heroes is set in its own fictional world, rather than the DC universe.

Game mechanics
The system features a comparative style of mechanics in which Acting Attributes are compared to Opposing Attributes on one chart, then Effect Attributes are compared to Resistance Attributes on a linked chart. It is a point-based system starting with a base of 450 Hero Points to create a character, which allows the player to design a character typical to sidekick power levels. In the system there is the option to increase this amount by 450 point amounts to make more powerful characters. Unlike the DC Heroes game, this increase does not also increase the costs of Advantages and Drawbacks.

Setting
The actual world included with the game is a 1990s style superhero world with a heavy influence of occult and magical beings, which accounts for the much more detailed magic system included in the game.

Publication history
After Mayfair Games stopped publishing DC Heroes, the rights to the game's mechanics were licensed to a new company called Pulsar Games, who was trying to acquire them even before the original Mayfair went under. Pulsar published the super-hero game Blood of Heroes (1998), which was nearly identical to third edition DC Heroes, minus the DC characters. The original Blood of Heroes was criticized due to poor artwork. A second edition, titled "Blood of Heroes: Special Edition" (pictured above) was printed in 2000 and featured expanded rules and new artwork, including cover art by Dave Dorman. The company went out of business in 2003.

In 2004 Pulsar Games was sold to new owners. Since then, nothing has been done official with the game, leaving it inactive.

References

External links
Official site
Primary fan site

Alternate history role-playing games
Campaign settings
Superhero role-playing games